The Diocese of Tacámbaro is a Latin Church ecclesiastical territory or diocese of the Catholic Church. The diocese is a suffragan in the ecclesiastical province of the metropolitan Archdiocese of Morelia. The diocese was erected on 26 July 1913. Its cathedra is found within Cathedral of St. Jerome, in the episcopal see of Tacámbaro, Michoacán.

Bishops

Ordinaries
Leopoldo Lara y Torres (1920 -1933) 
Manuel Pío López Estrada (1934 -1939), appointed Bishop of Veracruz-Jalapa
José Abraham Martínez Betancourt (1940 -1979) 
Luis Morales Reyes (1979 -1985),  appointed Coadjutor Bishop of Torreón, Coahuila
Alberto Suárez Inda (1985 -1995), appointed Archbishop of Morelia, Michoacán; elevated to cardinal in 2015
Rogelio Cabrera López (1996 -2001), appointed Bishop of Tapachula, Chiapas
José Luis Castro Medellín, M.S.F. (2002 - 2014)
Gerardo Díaz Vázquez (2014 - )

Auxiliary bishop
Luis Morales Reyes (1976-1979), appointed Bishop here

Other priests of this diocese who became bishops
Eduardo Cirilo Carmona Ortega (priest here, 1983-1991), appointed Bishop of Puerto Escondido, Oaxaca in 2003
Joel Ocampo Gorostieta, appointed Bishop of Ciudad Altamirano, Guerrero in 2019

Territorial losses

Episcopal See
Tacámbaro, Michoacán

External links and references

Tacambaro
Tacambaro, Roman Catholic Diocese of
Ciudad Lazaro Cardenas
Ciudad Lazaro Cardenas
1913 establishments in Mexico